MediaCorp Channel 8's television series You Can Be an Angel Too is a nursing drama series produced by MediaCorp Singapore in 2014. The series, which is sponsored by the Care To Go Beyond movement by the Ministry of Health of Singapore, revolves around the lives of a group of dedicated nurses at Ai De Hospital, and how they balance the passion for their job with the challenges they face in their personal lives.

As of 30 January 2015, all 20 episodes of You Can Be an Angel Too have been aired on MediaCorp Channel 8.

Episodic Guide

See also
 Ministry of Health (Singapore)

References

Lists of Singaporean television series episodes